Tell It Like It Is was a Chinese television talk show broadcast by China Central Television.  It premiered in 1996 as the first major talk show in Mainland China and went off the air in 2009.

It was hosted by Cui Yongyuan from 1996 to 2002 and by He Jing from 2002 to 2009.

References

Chinese television talk shows
Chinese television shows
China Central Television
1990s Chinese television series
1996 Chinese television series debuts
2009 Chinese television series endings
Mandarin-language television shows